Cune may refer to:

 , a Japanese band on Rainbow Entertainment
 Cune Press, American publisher established in 1994
 CUNE wine, produced by Compañía Vinícola del Norte de España
 Jovan Gojković (known as "Cune"; 1975–2001), Serbian football player
 Predrag Gojković-Cune (known as "Cune"; 1932–2017), Serbian singer

See also
 McCune (disambiguation)